The Indescribable Wow is the fifth studio album from American singer and songwriter Sam Phillips. It is her first album for Virgin Records and her first album she released after moving from Christian pop to secular alternative rock and using the name Sam rather than Leslie. The single "Holding On to the Earth" peaked at No. 22 on the Billboard Modern Rock Tracks chart in early 1989.

Reception

The Indescribable Wow was well received. In Rolling Stone the reviewer said, "Phillips is a major talent, with great rewards to offer" while AllMusic states that the album's music is "timeless".

Track listing

Personnel 
 Sam Phillips – vocals, guitars
 Mike Utley – organ
 David Miner – harpsichord, harmonium, bass
 T Bone Burnett – guitars, mandocello, Marxophone, arrangements (5)
 Jerry Scheff – bass
 Mickey Curry – drums
 Steve Jordan – drums
 Alex Acuña – drums, percussion
 Ralph Forbes – drum machine
 Darrell Leonard – trumpet
 Buell Neidlinger – cello, string bass
 Van Dyke Parks – arrangements (5)

Production 
 T Bone Burnett – producer
 Rik Pekkonen – recording
 Tchad Blake – additional recording
 Mike Ross – recording assistant 
 Dave Knight – assistant engineer
 Clif Norrell – assistant engineer
 Brian Soucy – assistant engineer
 Kevin Killen – mixing
 Howie Weinberg – mastering at Masterdisk (New York City, New York)
 Jeff Ayeroff – art direction 
 Mick Haggerty – art direction, design, cover photography 
 Melanie Nissen – back and inside photography

References

1988 albums
Sam Phillips (musician) albums
Albums produced by T Bone Burnett
Virgin Records albums